Ashes in the Brittle Air is the third album by the gothic darkwave band Black Tape for a Blue Girl. It was released in 1989 by Projekt Records and contains one of their best known songs, "Across a Thousand Blades" sung by Oscar Herrera.

Track listing 
 "Ashes in the Brittle Air" — 4:01
 "Across a Thousand Blades" — 3:40
 "The Touch and the Darkness" — 2:58
 "Through Sky Blue Rooms" — 1:36
 "The Scar of a Poet" — 7:29
 "You Tangle Within Me" — 4:25
 "From the Tightrope" — 4:46
 "Am I so Deceived" — 5:10
 "Is It Love That Dare Not Be?" — 2:17
 "I Ran to You" — 3:28
 "I Wish You Could Smile" — 2:58

Sources 

Black Tape for a Blue Girl albums
Projekt Records albums
1989 albums